is a Japanese footballer who plays for Japanese side Fujieda City Hall.

Club statistics
Updated to 22 February 2016.

References

External links

1991 births
Living people
Shizuoka University alumni
Association football people from Yamanashi Prefecture
Japanese footballers
J3 League players
Japan Football League players
Fujieda MYFC players
Association football forwards